The 1992 German Formula Three Championship was a multi-event motor racing championship for single-seat open wheel formula racing cars that held across Europe. The championship featured drivers competing in two-litre Formula Three racing cars which conform to the technical regulations, or formula, for the championship. It commenced on 4 April at Zolder and ended at Hockenheim on 11 October after thirteen double-header rounds.

Opel Team WTS driver Pedro Lamy became the first and only Portuguese champion. He won eleven races and scored another seven podium finishes on his way to championship title. Marco Werner finished as runner-up, losing the title battle after the retirement from the penultimate race of the season. Sascha Maassen was victorious at Wunstorf and Alemannenring. Diogo Castro Santos and Philipp Peter completed the top-five in the drivers' championship. Michael Krumm and Jörg Müller were the other race winners. Christian Abt clinched the B-Cup championship title.

Teams and drivers
{|
|

Calendar

Results

Championship standings

A-Class
Points are awarded as follows:

References

External links
 

German Formula Three Championship seasons
Formula Three season